Y S School is an initiative of the Young Scholars Group for secondary schooling and claims to "provide a conducive environment for young brains to explore the purpose of life. Y S School, founded in 1975, is an English-medium, co-educational school located in the Barnala district of the state of Punjab.

Affiliation and accreditation 
The school is affiliated to Central Board of Secondary Education (CBSE) since 1995 and has been running classes from Nursery to 10th Standard for more than three decades.

Curriculum 
The curriculum consists of Physics, Chemistry, Mathematics, Biology, Geography, History, Civics, Economics, Environmental Sciences, English, Hindi, Drawing, Political Science, Accountancy, Business and Robotic Science. The school has introduced classes of Robotics Science to students of 7th grade and above, parallel to the educational system.

References 
 Y.S School Barnala's 10th class (2008-09)..[memorable moment]
 Y S SCHOOL BARNALA PUNJAB
 YS school

Primary schools in India
High schools and secondary schools in Punjab, India
Barnala district
Educational institutions established in 1975
1975 establishments in Punjab, India